Joseph Paul Wanag (born August 2, 1966) is an American judoka. He trained under Kiyoshi Shiina. In 1992, Joe competed as member of the judo team representing the United States at the Olympic Summer Games held in Barcelona, Spain. He is a native of Wilton, Fairfield County, Connecticut, and graduated from Saint Lukes School in New Canaan. He is a World University champion and a Pan-American champion. He has also placed  in the 1991 World Championships, U.S; Open champion, Collegiate Champion, numerous national championships, and has also been inducted into the U.S. Judo Hall of Fame.  Joseph appeared in numerous publications, including the Judo Journal Newspaper, People Magazine, and United States Judo Federation Newspaper. He now lives in Litchfield County, Connecticut, with his children.

References 

American male judoka
Olympic judoka of the United States
Judoka at the 1992 Summer Olympics
1966 births
Living people
Pan American Games medalists in judo
Pan American Games gold medalists for the United States
Judoka at the 1991 Pan American Games